Fidel most commonly refers to:

 Fidel Castro (1926–2016), Cuban communist revolutionary and politician
 Fidel Ramos (1928–2022), Filipino politician and former president

Fidel may also refer to:

Other persons
 Fidel (given name)

Film
 Fidel (2002 film), a 2002 mini-series by David Attwood about Castro
 Fidel (2009 film), a 2009 Filipino indie film
 Fidel: The Untold Story, a 2001 a documentary about Castro

Other uses
 Fidel, a writing system used in Ethiopia and Eritrea, see Ge'ez script
 Vielle, a musical instrument and forerunner of the fiddle
 Fidel (imprint), an imprint of VDM Publishing devoted to the reproduction of Wikipedia content

See also
 Fidèle (disambiguation)